Krystal Rota (born 3 October 1985) is a New Zealand rugby league footballer.

She previously played for the New Zealand Warriors and Newcastle Knights in the NRL Women's Premiership.

Background
Born in Auckland, Rota began playing rugby league for the Manurewa Marlins when she was 17.

Playing career
In 2008, Rota was selected in the New Zealand train-on squad for the 2008 Women's Rugby League World Cup but was not selected in the final squad.

In 2015, Rota returned to rugby league after a three-year break. On 3 May 2015, she made her debut for New Zealand, coming off the bench in a 14–22 loss to Australia.

In 2017, Rota represented New Zealand at the 2017 Women's Rugby League World Cup.

On 31 July 2018, she joined the New Zealand Warriors NRL Women's Premiership team. In Round 1 of the 2018 NRL Women's season, she made her debut for the Warriors in their 10–4 win over the Sydney Roosters.

On 15 February 2019, Rota captained the Māori All Stars and scored a try in their 8–4 win over the Indigenous All Stars. In October 2019, she was a member of New Zealand's 2019 Rugby League World Cup 9s-winning squad.

On 22 February 2020, she captained the Māori All Stars in their 4–10 loss to the Indigenous All Stars. Rota withdrew from the 2020 NRL Women's season due to family and work commitments.

On 1 December 2021, Rota signed with the Newcastle Knights to be a part of their inaugural NRLW squad. In February 2022, she was announced as one of the club captains.

In Round 1 of the delayed 2021 NRL Women's season, Rota made her club debut for the Knights against the Parramatta Eels. She played in 4 matches for the Knights, before parting ways with the club at the end of the season.

In October 2022, she was selected for the New Zealand squad at the delayed 2021 Women's Rugby League World Cup in England.

References

External links
Newcastle Knights profile
NRL profile

1985 births
Living people
New Zealand Māori rugby league players
New Zealand female rugby league players
New Zealand women's national rugby league team captains
New Zealand women's national rugby league team players
New Zealand Warriors (NRLW) players
Newcastle Knights (NRLW) players
Rugby league hookers